Kjølv Egeland (8 September 1918 – 30 December 1999) was a Norwegian politician for the Labour Party. He was Minister of Education and Church Affairs 1976–1979.

He is the father of Jan Egeland (born 1957), former United Nations Undersecretary-General for Humanitarian Affairs and Emergency Relief Coordinator.

References

1918 births
1999 deaths
Government ministers of Norway
Ministers of Education of Norway